Michelle Gillingwater Pedersen (born 29 October 1987) is a Gibraltarian beauty pageant titleholder who was crowned Miss Gibraltar 2011. Gillingwater Pedersen, a private bank clerk and model represented Gibraltar as Miss Gibraltar in Miss World 2011 in London, UK on 6 November 2011.

Gillingwater Pedersen, speaks English, Danish and Spanish fluently.

Gillingwater Pedersen was crowned Miss Gibraltar by her predecessor, Larissa Dalli during a beauty pageant held at the Alameda Open Air Theatre on 25 June 2011.

Gillingwater Pedersen's mother Louise Gillingwater, also a Gibraltarian beauty pageant titleholder who was crowned Miss Gibraltar 1982, represented Gibraltar in Miss World 1982. They are the second mother & daughter to win the Miss Gibraltar title. 
She is of Danish descent.

References

External links
 Miss Gibraltar  website

1987 births
Living people
Miss Gibraltar winners
Miss World 2011 delegates